Samuel Ward McAllister (December 28, 1827 – January 31, 1895) was a popular arbiter of social taste in the Gilded Age of late 19th-century America. He was widely accepted as the authority as to which families could be classified as the cream of New York society (the Four Hundred). But his listings were also questioned by those excluded from them, and his own personal motives of self-aggrandisement were noted.

Early life
Born Samuel Ward McAllister to a socially prominent Savannah, Georgia, judicial family. His parents were Matthew Hall McAllister (1800–1865) and Louisa Charlotte (née Cutler) McAllister (1801–1869).

Through his maternal aunt, Julia Rush Cutler, and her husband, Samuel Ward, he was a first cousin of Julia Ward Howe and Samuel Cutler Ward, the lobbyist whose first wife Emily Astor had been the daughter of William Backhouse Astor Sr. and a granddaughter of John Jacob Astor. His maternal grandparents were Benjamin Clark Cutler, Norfolk County Sheriff, and Sarah (née Mitchell) Cutler.

In 1850, McAllister traveled to California with his father during the Gold Rush and became one of the partners in the law firm McAllister & Sons.

New York Society

McAllister wrote that after his marriage in 1853, he bought a farm on Narragansett Bay, planted trees and left for a three-year journey throughout Europe's great cities and spas—Bath, Pau, Bad Nauheim, and the like—where he observed the mannerisms of other wealthy Americans and titled nobility, returning to New York with his wife and two small children 15 October 1858. Using his wife's wealth and his own social connections, McAllister sought to become a tastemaker amongst New York's "Knickerbocracy", a collection of old merchant and landowning families who traced their lineage back to the days of colonial New Amsterdam. Above all in McAllister's life was his desire for social recognition by what he termed the "Ton," i. e. the cream of society.

Although purported to be an index of New York's best families, McAllister's list was suspiciously top-heavy with nouveau riche industrialists and McAllister's southern allies, seeking a new start in the nation's financial capital after the American Civil War. In his glory, McAllister referred to his patroness, Mrs. Caroline Astor (The Mrs. Astor), as his "Mystic Rose".  McAllister was an early summer colonist of Newport, Rhode Island, and was largely responsible for turning the simple seaside resort into a Mecca for the pleasure-seeking, status-conscious rich of the Gilded Age. His gift for party and picnic planning soon made him a society darling.

Among the undesirables McAllister endeavored to exclude from the charmed circle of the Four Hundred were the many nouveau riche Midwesterners who poured into New York seeking social recognition. In 1893, McAllister wrote a column about the 1893 World's Columbian Exposition in which he urged that if Chicago society hostesses wanted to be taken seriously, they should hire French chefs and "not frappé their wine too much."  The Chicago Journal replied, "The mayor will not frappé his wine too much. He will frappé it just enough so the guests can blow the foam off the tops of the glasses without a vulgar exhibition of lung and lip power. His ham sandwiches, sinkers, and ... pigs' feet, will be triumphs of the gastronomic art."

McAllister's downfall came when he published a book of memoirs entitled Society as I Have Found It in 1890. The book, and his hunger for media attention, did little to endear him to the old guard, who valued their privacy in an era when millionaires were the equivalent of modern movie stars.

"The Four Hundred"
McAllister coined the phrase "The Four Hundred" by declaring that there were "only 400 people in fashionable New York Society."  According to him, this was the number of people in New York who really mattered; the people who felt at ease in the ballrooms of high society ("If you go outside that number," he warned, "you strike people who are either not at ease in a ballroom or else make other people not at ease."). The number was popularly supposed to be the capacity of Mrs William Backhouse Astor Jr.'s ballroom. The lavish parties were held at the Astor mansion.

On February 16, 1892, McAllister named the official list of The Four Hundred in The New York Times.  The Four Million, the title of a book by O. Henry, was a reaction to this phrase, expressing O. Henry's opinion that every human being in New York was worthy of notice.

Society of Patriarchs
In 1872, McAllister founded the "Society of Patriarchs" which was a group of 25 gentlemen from New York Society.  The group of 25 were "representative men of worth, respectability, and responsibility."  Beginning with the 1885–1886 season, the Patriarchs threw a ball each year, known as the Patriarchs Ball, which each member was entitled to invite four ladies and five gentlemen to, thereby establishing the invitees as fit for society.  The first Patriarchs Ball was held at Delmonico's, with the Balls, which were difficult to obtain invitations to, receiving significant press coverage.  The Patriarchs Ball inspired similar balls, including the Ihpetonga Ball, which was considered "the most important social event of the season in Brooklyn."

The Society dissolved two years after McAllister's death in 1897 due to a lack of interest.

Personal life
On 15 March 1853, McAllister married a Georgia born heiress who was then living in Madison, New Jersey, Sarah Taintor Gibbons (1829–1909), the daughter of William Gibbons (1794–1852) and Abigail Louisa (née Taintor) Gibbons (1791–1844).  Her grandfather was politician, lawyer, and steamboat owner Thomas Gibbons.  Her father built the Gibbons Mansion in Madison, New Jersey, which her brother sold to Daniel Drew after their father's death, and which Drew donated to found Drew Theological Seminary (now known as Drew University).

Together, Ward and Sarah were the parents of:

 Louise Ward McAllister (1854–1923), who in 1920 married A. Nelson Lewis, a linguist who owned the 600 acre "old Lewis estate" at Havre de Grace, Maryland that had been in the family since 1806. She was engaged to George Barclay Ward (1845–1906) at the time of his death in 1907.
 Ward McAllister Jr. (1855–1908), an 1880 Harvard Law School graduate, who became a San Francisco lawyer who served as the first Federal district judge of the Territory of Alaska, beginning in 1884 and was responsible for the arrest of Sheldon Jackson.
 Heyward Hall McAllister (1859–1925), who married Janie Champion Garmany (b. 1867) of Savannah in 1892.  In what became a minor scandal when it was made public, the couple was secretly wed first in 1884, then in 1887, and lastly in 1892.  They later divorced and he married Melanie Jeanne Renke (d. 1939), who was born in France and did not speak English, in 1908.

Death
Ward McAllister died while dining alone, and in social disgrace for his writings, at New York's Union Club, in January 1895.  His funeral, held on February 5, 1895, was well attended by many society figures of the day, including Chauncey Depew and Cornelius Vanderbilt II. McAllister is interred at Green-Wood Cemetery in Brooklyn, New York.

In 1907, Sarah was described as having been an invalid for 25 years.

In popular culture

Ward McAllister is portrayed by Nathan Lane in the American television series The Gilded Age.

Notes

References

External links

 
 
 1877 Portrait of McAllister by Adolphe Yvon at the New-York Historical Society
 
McCallister biography at "Class and Leisure at America's First Resort"

1827 births
1895 deaths
American socialites
Gilded Age
People from Savannah, Georgia
People included in New York Society's Four Hundred